In the 1859 United Kingdom general election returned no party a majority of seats in the House of Commons. The Earl of Derby's Conservatives formed a minority government, but  despite making overall gains, Derby's government was defeated in a confidence vote by an alliance of Palmerston's Whigs together with Peelites, Radicals and the Irish Brigade. Palmerston subsequently formed a new government from this alliance which is now considered to be the first Liberal Party administration.

There is no separate tally of votes or seats for the Peelites. They did not contest elections as an organised party but more as independent Free trade Conservatives with varying degrees of distance from the two main parties.

It was also the last general election entered by the Chartists, before their organisation was dissolved.

The election was the quietest and least competitive between 1832 and 1885, with most county elections being uncontested. The election also saw the lowest number of candidates between 1832 and 1885, with Tory gains potentially being the result of a lack of opposition as much as a change in public opinion.
According to A.J.P. Taylor:
 the government which Palmerston organized in June 1859 was a coalition of a different kind : not a coalition of groups which looked back to the past, but a coalition which anticipated the future. Had it not been for Palmerston himself^too individual, too full of personality to be fitted into a party-pattem—it would have been the first Liberal government in our history. Everything that was important in it was Liberal—finance, administrative reform, its very composition : the first government with unmistakable middle-class Free Traders as members.

Results

|}

Regional results

Great Britain

England

Scotland

Wales

Ireland

Universities

See also
 List of MPs elected in the 1859 United Kingdom general election
 1859 United Kingdom general election in Ireland

References

Sources

External links
Spartacus: Political Parties and Election Results

 
1859 elections in the United Kingdom
General election
1859
April 1859 events
May 1859 events